Tapas Relia (born 11 August 1978) is an Indian music composer and producer, known for his famous advertising campaigns for brands like Close-Up (toothpaste), Domino's Pizza, Amaron Batteries, IPL and Mahabharat. In Mumbai since 1996, he has also scored music for Bollywood films, including India's first major commercial animation film Hanuman and the recently released film Lakshmi, a film on child trafficking by acclaimed director Nagesh Kukunoor. Based in Mumbai, he works and operates from his own recording studio.

Early life
Tapas Relia was born in Surat, Gujarat, to a Gujarati couple natively from Surat but living in Ahmedabad. He spent his entire childhood and teenage years in Ahmedabad and finished higher secondary school from St. Xavier's High School, Loyola Hall, Ahmedabad. In 1996 he moved to Mumbai to pursue further education and a career in music. He started learning western classical music, with piano as his principal instrument, and finished 7 grades of the Trinity Laban Conservatoire of Music and Dance in London. Simultaneously, he also experimented in the avenue of commercial music and taught himself music programming on synthesisers and sequencers. In the year 2000 he went to the US, and studied Composing for Film and Multimedia in New York University, New York City as a summer course, and returned to India in the same year, post its completion.

Advertising career
He started composing and arranging music for small advertising jobs, primarily in the corporate and radio sector. His first major break in mainstream advertising came in the form of the jingle Kya Aap Closeup Karte Hain for Close-Up toothpaste. It was a huge success, and is considered to be one of the top jingles of all time even today. After that he went onto compose hundreds of Ads and other jingles for leading brands and agencies, including the Amaron Batteries campaign, Domino's Pizza Pizza Aaye Free campaign, Hero Honda (2010) campaign, IPL Mumbai Indians Anthem, and several other advertising campaigns, including ad campaigns and promos for leading Television shows like Mahabharata (2013) Kaun Banega Crorepati Season 3, Bigg Boss and MasterChef India.

Bollywood career
After becoming a well recognised name in the advertising field, he was approached by Percept Picture Company to score the music for India's first animation film called Hanuman, which was based on the Indian God. The movie was declared a hit, and the music was well received critically and commercially. Following the success of Hanuman, Percept Picture Company offered him the sequel Return of Hanuman in the year 2007, which was directed by ace film maker Anurag Kashyap. Tapas won the 'Golden Cursor Animation Award' for best music. In the year 2008, Tapas was approached by the critically acclaimed film maker Nagesh Kukunoor to write music for his film Yeh Hausla, starring Karan Nath and Sameera Reddy in the lead. The movie which was produced by Percept Picture Company, never released though. He then scored the music for Nagesh Kukunoor’s Mod (2011) and followed up with the critically acclaimed Lakshmi (2014). His music in Lakshmi was hugely appreciated by critics and audiences alike. In 2012 he scored the background music for Vidhu Vinod Chopra’s Ferrari Ki Sawaari directed by Rajesh Mapuskar. Currently he is working on his next film with Nagesh Kukunoor called ‘Dhanak’, which is slated for a 2015 India Release.

Filmography

References

External links

 
 

People from Surat
1978 births
Living people
Indian film score composers
Indian record producers
Television composers
Jingle composers
Gujarati people
New York University alumni